The 2016–17 Professional U18 Development League was the fifth season of the Professional Development League system for youth football.

League 1

The league was split into two regional divisions, north and south. After playing each team in their own division twice, the league was split into a second league stage consisting of three further divisions. The winning team of Group A in the second league stage became the overall champion and qualified for the UEFA Youth League for the 2017–18 season.

First League Stage

North Division

South Division

Second league stage

Group 1

Group 2

Group 3

League 2

The Professional U18 Development League 2, also known as U18 PDL-2, was split into two regional divisions.

Teams played each team in their own division twice, and each team in the other division once, for a total of 28 games each.

At the end of the season, the teams finishing in the top two positions of both divisions met in the knockout stage to determine the overall league champion.

Tables

North Division

Source - Professional Development League North results

South Division

Source - Professional Development League South results

Knockout stage 
Semi-finals

Final

Notes

See also
 2016–17 Professional U23 Development League
 2016–17 FA Youth Cup
 2016–17 in English football

References

2016–17 in English football leagues
2016-17